This is a complete list of multinational corporations, also known as multinational companies in worldwide or global enterprises.

These are corporate organizations that own or control production of goods or services in two or more countries other than their home countries.

List
A listing of multinational corporations (sorted A-Z) includes:

 85C Bakery Cafe
 10.Or
 2U
 3i
 3M
 7-Eleven
 4F
 Ajinomoto
 AB InBev
 ABN AMRO
 Abbott Laboratories
 Abiomed
 AbbVie
 Accenture
 Australia and New Zealand Banking Group
 Acer Inc.
 Activision Blizzard
 Adidas
 Aldi
 Adient
 Aditi Technologies
 Aditya Birla Group
 Adobe Inc.
 Advanced Micro Devices
 Aegon
 AEON
 Ahold Delhaize
 Asics
 Airbnb
 Airbus
 AkzoNobel
 Akai
 Alfa Laval
 All Nippon Airways
 Alliance Global Group Inc.
 Allianz
 Alibaba Group
 Almarai
 Alstom
 Alphabet Inc.
 Altice
 Altria Group
 Amazon
 Amcor
 American Airlines Group
 American Express
 American International Group
 Andritz AG
 Aon 
 Apollo Tyres
 Apple
 Arcor
 Assicurazioni Generali
 Aston Martin
 Asus
 AsusTek
 AT&T
 Atari
 Avianca
 AXA
 Axiata Group
 Axis Bank Ltd
 BP
 Baker Hughes
 Ball Corporation
 Bacardi
 Banco Bilbao Vizcaya Argentaria
 Banco Santander
 Bandai Namco Entertainment
 Bank of India
 Bank of Ireland
 Bank of Montreal
 Barclays
 Barilla
 Barnes & Noble
 Barrick Gold Corporation
 BASF
 Bata
 Baidu
 Bayer
 Becton Dickinson
 Beko
 Bertelsmann
 Benetton Group
 Best Buy
 Bharti Airtel
 Bharti Enterprises
 Bihl
 Billabong
 Black & Decker
 BlackRock
 BMW
 BBK Electronics
 BBC
 BNP Paribas
 Bose Corporation
 Boeing
 Bombardier Inc.
 Books-A-Million
 Bouygues
 BRAC
 Brown–Forman
 Bridgestone
 British Airways
 British Petroleum
 Burberry
 BT Group
 ByteDance
 BYD
 Capcom
 Canon Inc
 Capgemini
 Casio
 Capital One
 Cargill
 Cargolux
 Caribbean Airlines
 Carlsberg Group
 Carrefour
 Caterpillar Inc.
 Celestica
 Celkon Mobiles
 Cencosud
 Chupa Chups
 China Mobile
 Changhong
 Chanel
 Chiquita Brands International
 Chevron
 China Merchants Bank
 China Resources
 Chubb
 CIMC
 Cisco Systems
 Citigroup
 Coolpad
 The Coca-Cola Company
 The Coffee Bean & Tea Leaf
 Cognizant Technology Solutions
 Colgate-Palmolive Company
 Comac
 Concentrix
 ConocoPhillips
 Copa
 Costco
 Coty inc
 Creative Labs
 Crédit Agricole
 Crocs
 Credit Suisse
 Cummins
 Currys plc
 Cyient
 CyrusOne
 D-Link
 Dabur
 Daikin
 Daimler AG
 Dangote Group
 Daihatsu
 Danone
 Dalton Maag
 Darden Studio
 Decathlon
 Deepin
 Dell Technologies
 Deloitte
 Delta Air Lines
 Deutsche Bank
 Deutsche Post
 Diageo
 Dior
 Dine Brands Global
 Dixons Carphone
 Dow Inc
 Dollar Tree
 DocuSign
 Dole Food Company
 Domino%27s Pizza
 Dude Perfect
 DuPont
 DXC Technology
 Dyson
 eBay
 Electronic Arts
 Embraer
 Emerson Electric
 Emigre
 Eni
 Ericsson
 Est%C3%A9e Lauder Companies
 Etisalat
 Eva Air
 Evergreen Marine
 Evercore
 ExxonMobil
 Ezaki Glico
 EY
 Faber-Castell
 Fairphone
 Fast Retailing
 FBT
 FedEx Corporation
 Ferrari
 Ferrero
 Fila
 Ficosa
 FIS
 Font Bureau
 FontShop
 Ford Motor Company
 Fortinet
 Fossil Group
 Foxconn
 FPT Group
 Fujifilm
 Fujitsu
 Fujiya
 Future Group
 GameStop
 Gap Inc.
 Garmin
 Gartner
 Gazprom
 Geeknet
 General Electric
 Goldman Sachs
 Gree Electric
 General Mills
 General Motors
 Generali
 Gerdau
 Giant Bicycles
 Gucci
 Globe Telecom
 GungHo Online Entertainment
 Guinness
 Guess
 Glaxo Smith Kline
 Geely
 Goodyear Tire and Rubber Company
 Google
 GoDaddy
 GoPro
 Harley-Davidson
 Herm%C3%A8s
 Haier
 Harrods
 Haribo
 Hard Rock Cafe
 Halliburton
 Hankook Tire
 Heineken N.V.
 House Foods
 Hartwall
 H%26M
 Hasbro
 Hearst Corporation
 Henkel
 Hewlett Packard Enterprise
 Hilti
 Hisamitsu
 Hitachi
 Honda
 Honeywell
 HP Inc
 Hsbc holdings plc
 HTC
 Huayi Brothers
 Huawei investment and holdings
 Huntington Bancshares
 Huntington Ingalls Industries
 Huntsman Corporation
 Hytera
 HMD Global
 Hyundai Motor Company
 IBM
 ICAP
 ICICI Bank
 IJM Corporation
 Indeed
 Inditex
 Intracom
 IKEA
 Illinois Tool Works
 Infosys
 ING Group
 Ingersoll Rand
 Intel Corporation
 Intesa Sanpaolo
 Isuzu
 Jelly Belly
 The J.M. Smucker Company
 Jardine Matheson
 JG Summit Holdings
 Johnnie Walker
 Johnson & Johnson
 Jollibee Foods Corporation
 JPMorgan Chase & Co.
 JVCKenwood
 JXD
 KBC Bank
 Kawasaki
 Kappa
 Kellogg%27s
 Kering
 Kikkoman
 Kirin Company
 Kimberly-Clark
 Kingston Technology
 Klim Type Foundry
 Komatsu Limited
 Konami
 Korg
 Keumyoung Group
 KPMG
 Kraft Heinz
 Lactalis
 Lam Research
 Lagardère
 Larsen & Toubro
 LATAM Airlines
 Lazada
 The Lego Group
 Levi Strauss %26 Co.
 Lear
 Lindt %26 Spr%C3%BCngli
 Lenovo
 LeEco
 Leonardo
 Leoni AG
 Lexmark
 LG Electronics
 Linde
 Linpus
 Lionbridge
 LiuGong
 Lockheed Martin
 L'Oréal
 Lotte Group
 Louisa Coffee
 Lufthansa
 Lukoil
 Lupin
 Luxgen
 Luxottica
 LVMH
 LyondellBasell Industries
 MG Cars
 Macy's
 Mahindra Group
 Mars, Incorporated
 Mastercard
 Maton
 Marshall Amplification
 Mark Simonson Studio
 Maersk
 Mama Sita%27s Holding Company
 Mamee Double-Decker
 Mattel
 Maxxis
 McCain Foods
 McDonald's
 MediaTek
 Meiji Holdings
 Meitu
 Meizu
 melstacorp
 Mercedes-Benz Group
 Meta Platforms
 Michaels
 Michelin
 Micro-Star International 
 Micromax Informatics
 Microsoft
 Mizuno Corporation
 Millipore Corporation
 Miniso
 Mindtree
 Mitsubishi Electric
 Mobil
 Monotype
 Monotype Imaging
 Morinaga %26 Company
 Mustek
 Nando%27s
 Namco Bandai Holdings
 New Balance
 Newell Brands
 Nestlé
 NEC
 NetApp Inc.
 Netflix
 Nike, Inc.
 Nivea
 Nikon
 Nintendo
 Nissan
 Nokia
 Norsk Hydro (ASA)
 Novartis
 Novo Nordisk
 Olympus Corporation
 Oknoplast
 Ooredoo
 Otobi
 Oracle Corporation
 Orange S.A.
 Ornua
 Pandora
 Panasonic Corporation
 Paramount Global
 Parrot
 PayPal
 Puma 
 Pepper Lunch
 PepsiCo
 Perficient
 Petronas
 Pernod Ricard
 Petrovietnam
 Pfizer
 Philips
 Ping An Bank
 Ping An Insurance
 Pioneer Corporation
 Pirelli
 Pilot
 Playmobil
 Pladis
 PLDT
 Pollo Campero
 Procter & Gamble
 Proton
 Prada
 Prudential Financial
 PVH
 PwC
 QNB Group
 Qantas
 Qualcomm
 QatarEnergy
 Rabobank
 Ranpak
 Reckitt Benckiser
 Recruit
 Red Bull
 Regus
 Reliance Industries Limited
 Renault
 Repsol
 Richemont
 Ricoh
 Robert Bosch GmbH
 Roland Corporation
 Rohde & Schwarz
 Royal Bank of Canada
 Royal Dutch Shell
 RPG Group
 Rusal
 Saab AB
 Samsung
 Samsonite
 Salesforce
 San Miguel Corporation
 Sandvik
 Sanrio
 Sanofi Aventis
 Saudi Aramco
 SAP SE
 SAS Group
 Sasken Communication Technologies Limited
 Sasol
 Schlumberger
 Schwan-Stabilo
 Schneider Electric
 Schindler Group
 Schleich
 Scotiabank
 Scholastic Corporation
 Seiko
 Sennheiser
 Sphero
 Spin Master
 Serta
 Seagate Technology
 Sega Sammy Holdings
 Servcorp
 Severstal
 SF Express
 SGS S.A.
 Shenzhen Airlines
 Shiseido
 Siemens
 Sime Darby Properties
 SilkRoad
 Soci%C3%A9t%C3%A9 Bic
 SmartStudy
 SM Investments Corporation
 Société Générale
 Sogou
 SK Group
 Skullcandy
 Sony
 SoftBank Group
 Southwest Airlines
 Spotify
 Square Enix
 Škoda Auto
 Staedtler
 Standard Chartered
 Starbucks
 State Bank of India
 Subway
 Stellantis
 Suntory
 Suzuki
 Swarovski
 Swinkels Family Brewers
 Taco Maker
 Take-Two Interactive
 Tapestry, Inc.
 Target
 Tabasco sauce
 Tate & Lyle
 TCL Technology
 Tata group
 TEAC Corporation
 TechniSat
 Telefonica
 Tencent
 The Home Depot
 The Hershey Company
 The Swatch Group
 Tesco
 Tesla
 Telstra
 Texas Instruments
 TNT Express
 Textron
 Thomson Reuters
 Ting Hsin International Group
 TKK Fried Chicken
 Toshiba
 TomTom
 Tomy
 Total S.A.
 TikTok
 TPG Telecom
 TDK
 TMK
 Toyota
 Trend Micro
 TP-Link
 TSMC
 Typotheque
 Uber
 UMC* Unicredit
 Unilever
 United Parcel Service
 Ubisoft
 Unisys
 vanguard group
 Volvo
 Vanke
 Vestas
 Verisk Analytics
 Vertiv
 VF Corporation
 Viettel Mobile
 Victoria's Secret
 Victorinox
 Vimpelcom
 Virgin Group
 Visa Inc.
 Vitol
 Vizio
 Vivendi
 Vinamilk
 Vodafone
 Voith
 Volkswagen Group
 Wendy's
 Want Want
 Wal-Mart
 The Walt Disney Company
 Warner Bros. Discovery
 Wawa
 Whirlpool Corporation
 Wingstop
 Wipro
 Wirecard
 Xiaomi Corporation
 Xtep
 Yili Group
 Yamaha Corporation
 Yandex
 Yokohama Rubber Company
 Yamaha Motor Company
 Yum brands
 Zensar Technologies
 Zhujiang Beer
 ZTE
 Zippo

See also

.01
Multinational